Paúl Alberto Torres García (born  November 21, 1983 in Caracas) is a Venezuelan professional racing cyclist.

Career

2004
 1st in Stage 4 Tour de la Guadeloupe, Vieux-Habitants (GUA)
2005
 1st in Stage 2 Vuelta Internacional al Estado Trujillo, Betijoque (VEN)
 1st in Stage 3 Vuelta Internacional al Estado Trujillo, Circuito El Dividive-Sabana de Mendoza (VEN)
2006
 1st in Stage 6 Vuelta Internacional al Estado Trujillo, Bocono (VEN)
 1st in Stage 8 Vuelta Internacional al Estado Trujillo (VEN)
 2nd in General Classification Vuelta Internacional al Estado Trujillo (VEN)
2008
 1st in Stage 7 Vuelta al Táchira, El Vígia (VEN)

External links

1983 births
Living people
Venezuelan male cyclists
People from Caracas
Tour de Guadeloupe stage winners